Laurentino "Nito" Cortizo Cohen (born 30 January 1953) is a Panamanian politician who has served as the President of Panama since 2019. Cortizo is the former President of the National Assembly and Minister of Agricultural and Livestock Development. He was also a member of the National Assembly between 1994 and 2004, serving a year as chamber president.

A member of the Democratic Revolutionary Party, he was elected as president on in the 2019 general election, winning 33.27% of the vote. He took office on 1 July 2019.

Early life and education
Laurentino Cortizo Cohen was born in Panama City to Laurentino Cortizo, a Galician from Beariz, Spain, and Esther Cohen, of Jewish descent.

The eldest of six siblings, Cortizo attended Javier Elementary School and completed his secondary education at La Salle College in Diriamba, Nicaragua. He then went on to attend the Valley Forge Military Academy in Pennsylvania. After this, he studied at Norwich University in Vermont, the oldest military college in the United States. Cortizo then attended the University of Texas at Austin, earning a master's degree in business administration and later a doctorate.

Early career 

After graduation, Cortizo moved to Washington, D.C., in 1981 to work as a technical advisor to the secretary-general of the Organization of American States (OAS).

In November 1986, Cortizo assumed the role of Panama's alternate ambassador to the OAS. During that time, he was a member of the budget committee and the working group for the private sector. In addition, Cortizo chaired the working group for development problems of the states of the Central American isthmus and the permanent executive committee of the economic and social council.

Political career 
Cortizo served as a member of the National Assembly from 1994 to 2004 and is described as being from the centrist wing of his party. He became President of the National Assembly in 2000, serving until 2001.

He also served as Minister of Agricultural and Livestock Development under President Martín Torrijos, however he resigned in 2006 due to his objections to the negotiations made in pursuit of the US-Panama Free Trade Agreement.

Personal life 
Cortizo is married to Yazmín Colón de Cortizo. They have two children, Carolina and Jorge. Carolina is currently the director of Wingo that is part of Copa Airlines.

In June 2022, Cortizo was diagnosed with myelodysplastic syndrome.

Cortizo is a devout Roman Catholic and often reads the Bible.

References

External links
Site of Laurentino Cortizo (in Spanish)
Biography by CIDOB (in Spanish)

|-

|-

|-

1953 births
Panamanian people of Spanish descent
Living people
Democratic Revolutionary Party politicians
Jewish presidents
McCombs School of Business alumni
Norwich University alumni
Panamanian people of Galician descent
Panamanian people of Jewish descent
People from Panama City
Panamanian Jews
Presidents of the National Assembly (Panama)
Presidents of Panama
Panamanian Roman Catholics